Rhopaliella bicolorata' is a species of beetle in the family Cerambycidae. It was described by Monné in 1989.

References

Rhopalophorini
Beetles described in 1989